No. 529 Squadron RAF was a radar calibration unit of the Royal Air Force during World War II. The unit had the distinction to be the only RAF unit to fly autogyros and helicopters operationally during World War II.

History
No. 529 Squadron was formed on 15 June 1943 from No. 1448 Flight at RAF Halton. This flight under the experienced rotary aircraft pilot Squadron Leader Alan Marsh had pioneered radar calibration using Autogyros and light aircraft and the squadron continued to do this until after the end of World War II. On 16 August 1944 the squadron moved to a field at Crazies Farm, Henley-on-Thames and on that field they became the first RAF squadron to fly a helicopter for operational use, when they received their first Vought-Sikorsky Hoverfly. It was disbanded on 20 October 1945 at RAF Henley-on-Thames.

Aircraft operated

Squadron bases

References

Notes

Bibliography

Aircraft squadrons of the Royal Air Force in World War II
529 Squadron
Military units and formations established in 1943
Military units and formations disestablished in 1945